Changhua (Hokkien POJ: Chiong-hòa or Chiang-hòa), officially known as Changhua City, is a county-administered city and the county seat of Changhua County in Taiwan Province of the Republic of China. For many centuries the site was home to a settlement of Babuza people, a coastal tribe of Taiwanese aborigines. Changhua city is ranked first by population among county-administered cities. It is part of the Taichung–Changhua metropolitan area, which is the second largest in Taiwan.

Historically, Changhua city was a base for the Han Chinese when they invaded Taiwan against the Taiwanese aborigines, constructing a fortress built out of bamboo. Changhua has a nickname of "Bamboo Town".

Changhua is best known for its landmark Great Buddha Statue of Baguashan. At 26 metres tall, the statue sits atop Bagua Mountain overlooking the city. The main walkway up to the giant is lined with statues of figures from Buddhist lore. Another site of interest is Taiwan's oldest temple honoring Confucius.

History
Poasoa (transliterated into ) was once a center of settlement for the Babuza people (a plains aboriginal tribe). During the Dutch period, the area was under the administration of Favorlang (modern-day Huwei, Yunlin) and was controlled by the Dutch East India Company. During the Siege of Fort Zeelandia, the area was also one of Koxinga's central defense and attack bases. During the Chinese immigration of the 17th century, Changhua city was one of the four cities that had major immigration; it was one of the oldest Han Chinese settlements.

By 1694, Poasoa Village had been established. During the late 17th to late 19th century the area continued to be one of the major urban settlements in central Taiwan. In 1723, Changhua County was established, following the Zhu Yigui rebellion. Despite that, rebellions and civil wars continued.

Empire of Japan
The origin of the modern Changhua City is attributed to the Japanese administration, as they made the city into the official county seat in 1897 under . During this era, the Japanese pronunciation Shōka came into use, alongside the "Chinese spellings" of "Changwha, Changhwa, Changhoa, Chanhue, Chan-hua, Tchanghoua".

In 1920, Shoka was governed under the new Taichū Prefecture.

Republic of China
After the handover of Taiwan from Japan to the Republic of China on 25 October 1945, Changhua City was established as provincial city of Taiwan Province on 25 December the same year. On 30 November 1951, the Changhua City Office was established and subsequently on 1 December 1951, it was downgraded to county-administered city and became the county seat of Changhua County.

Geography
Changhua city has plenty of flat lands, however, the flat lands are divided in two portions by the Central Mountain Range of Taiwan. One on the South Eastern area and the other on the North Western area. The North Eastern area, although being flat, is often affected by soil erosion caused by typhoons during the summer, thus is not suitable for living.

Rainfall decreases westward closer to the coastline.

Government
Changhua contains the Changhua County Government and Changhua County Council.

Administrative divisions

Changhua City is divided into the following villages (in romanized alphabetical order):

Anxi, Ayi, Baobu, Chenggong, Citong, Datong, Dazhu, Fuan, Fugui, Fushan, Futian, Fuxing, Guangfu, Guanghua, Guangnan, Guashan, Guosheng, Guyi, Hediao, Huabei, Huayang, Jiadong, Jianan, Jianbao, Jieshou, Kuaiguan, Longshan, Lunping, Minquan, Minsheng, Nanan, Nanmei, Nanxing, Nanyao, Niupu, Pinghe, Sancun, Shipai, Taifeng, Taoyuan, Tianzhong, Tungfang, Tungxing, Wanan, Wanshou, Wenhua, Wuquan, Xiabu, Xian Xiangshan, Xiangyang, Xingbei, Xinhua, Xinxing, Xinyi, Xishi, Xixing, Yangming, Yanhe, Yanping, Yongfu, Yongsheng, Zhangan, Zhangle, Zhongquan, Zhongshan, Zhongxiao, Zhongyang, Zhongzheng, Zhongzhuang, Zhuanyao, Zhuxiang and Zhuzhong.

Economy
Changhua City is one of the more developed areas of Changhua County, industrialization has been ongoing since the 1970s. This is reflected by an increase of factories in Changhua and decreasing amount of agricultural fields. From a poll in 1992, 43.2% of respondents worked in the service sector, 42.4% in the industrial sector and only 14.4% in either the agricultural or fishing sector.

Education

The earliest school in Changhua dated back to 1726 during the Qing dynasty. The Japanese administration also improved the education system in Changhua City. Changhua City has 15 elementary schools, 7 junior high schools, 7 senior high schools and 2 technical schools/universities.

Universities
 National Changhua University of Education
 Chienkuo Technology University

High schools
 National Changhua Senior High School
 Changhua Girls' Senior High School
 Changhua Arts High School (CHASH)
 National Changhua Senior School of Commerce (CHSC)
 The Affiliated Industrial Vocational High School of National Changhua University of Education (SIVS)
 Zen Del Senior High School (ZDVS)
 Ching Cheng High School (CCH)

Libraries
 Changhua City Library

Tourist attractions

 1895 Baguashan Anti-Japanese Martyrs' Museum
 Anti-Japanese Martyrs' Monument Park
 Baguashan Great Buddha
 Baguashan Literature Walk (八卦山文學步道)
 Baguashan Silver Bridge (八卦山銀橋)
 Changhua Arts Hall
 Changhua County Art Museum
 Changhua Railway Hospital
 Changhua Wude Hall
 Confucian Temple of Changhua
 Changhua Roundhouse
 Gu-Yue Folk Museum (古月民俗館)
 Huayang Park (華陽公園)
 Hsinding Old Street (新町老街)
 Kaihua Temple
 Lai Ho Memorial Hall
 Museum of Traditional Nan Bei Music and Theater
 Nanyao Temple
 National Changhua Living Art Center
 Red Hair Well (紅毛井)
 Spring of Youth
 Shengwang Temple
 Yuanching Temple
 Yuan Ching Kaun Tradition Art Museum (元清觀民藝館)

Transportation

Changhua Station is the only Taiwan Railways Administration station in Changhua City.

Freeway 1 connects Changhua City to Taichung City and is one of the primary route for commuters between the two cities. Freeway 3 intersects with Freeway 1 at Changhua and connects to Provincial Highway 74.

Other events
On 25 May 2002, China Airlines Flight 611 broke into pieces in mid-air. Parts of the plane landed in Changhua.

References

External links